Nonosbawsut (died March 1819) was a leader of the Beothuk people. Family head and partner of Demasduwit, born on the island of Newfoundland (present-day Newfoundland and Labrador, Canada). Sometimes referred to as Chief Nonosbawsut, his stature within the last remaining Beothuk would better be described as that of a headman or leader.

Biography
Nonosbawsut was one of a group of Beothuk who was encountered by David Buchan on January 24, 1811 at Red Indian Lake. Buchan had left two marines at the native camp while he, Nonosbawsut and three other Beothuk went to retrieve a cache of presents Buchan had left behind. Fearing the worst, Nonosbawsut became suspicious of being captured; he and the two Beothuks fled. While back at the camp they had convinced the rest of the group that the intentions of Buchan and his marines were hostile. The two marines were beheaded and the camp was then dispersed.

Another expedition authorized by Governor Charles Hamilton to recover stolen property was led by John Peyton Jr. in March 1819. Apparently some items were stolen by the Beothuk from nearby fishing stations in the Bay of Exploits.  The fate of the last remaining Beothuk was very much a concern at that time and the expedition was also requested to establish friendly relations with them. On March 5 the party of Peyton's armed soldiers had surprised a small party of Beothuk at Red Indian Lake who attempted to escape. Peyton captured Demasduwit, the wife of Nonosbawsut. Nonosbawsut approached the party of armed men holding the tip of a pine branch, a symbol of peace, and through words and gestures asked Peyton to release the Demasduwit. A scuffle broke out when Peyton had refused to release her, and Nonosbawsut was shot and killed. 

Later, Peyton and his men were absolved of Nonosbawsut's murder by a grand jury in St. John's, the judge concluding that "... (there was) no malice on the part of Peyton's party to get possession of any of (the Indians) by such violence as would occasion bloodshed."

Nonosbawsut's body was placed in a sepulchre, later to be joined by his infant son and eventually Demasduwit herself.

Legacy
In 1828, the sepulchre was found by William Cormack, who at that time removed the skulls and some of the grave goods. Among the items taken by Cormack was Nonosbawsut's skull which was sent to the Royal Museum, Edinburgh, Scotland.

Genetic testing
In 2007, DNA testing was conducted on material from the teeth of Nonosbawsut and his wife Demasduit. The results assigned them to Haplogroup C (mtDNA) and Haplogroup X (mtDNA), respectively, which are also found in some current Mi'kmaq people in Newfoundland. Mi'kmaq have mixed ancestry with European and Beothuk, but no solely Mi'kmaq and Beothuk connection. Oral tradition on the island states that Beothuk did in fact have sexual relations with others on the island, of both Mi'qmak and a variety of European ethnic groups.

See also

List of people of Newfoundland and Labrador

References

External links 
Drawings by Shanawdithit
The Beothuk a heritage Newfoundland and Labrador website.

Year of birth unknown
1819 deaths
Indigenous leaders in Atlantic Canada
Beothuk people
People from Newfoundland (island)
Newfoundland Colony people
19th-century indigenous people of the Americas
Deaths by firearm in Newfoundland and Labrador
Violence against Indigenous people in Canada